Epichilo is a genus of moths of the family Crambidae.

Species
Epichilo irroralis (Hampson, 1919)
Epichilo obscurefasciellus (de Joannis, 1927)
Epichilo parvellus Ragonot in de Joannis & Ragonot, 1889
Epichilo vartianae Błeszyński, 1965

References

Crambinae
Crambidae genera
Taxa named by Émile Louis Ragonot